This is a list of notable Singaporean exchange-traded funds, or ETFs.

 ABF Singapore Bond Index Fund
 CIMB FTSE ASEAN40 ETF
 CIMB S&P Ethical Asia Pacific Dividend ETF
 db x-trackers CSI300 UCITS ETF
 db x-trackers DB Commodity Booster Bloomberg UCITS ETF
 db x-trackers DB Commodity Booster Light Energy Benchmark UCITS ETF
 db x-trackers EURO Stoxx 50® UCITS ETFF
 db x-trackers FTSE China 50 UCITS ETF
 db x-trackers Markit iBoxx ABF Indonesia Government UCITS ETF
 db x-trackers Markit iBoxx ABF Korea Government UCITS ETF
 db x-trackers Markit iBoxx ABF Singapore Government UCITS ETF
 db x-trackers Markit iBoxx ABF Korea Government UCITS ETF
 db x-trackers MSCI AC Asia Ex Japan Index UCITS ETF
 db x-trackers MSCI AC Asia Ex Japan High Dividend Yield Index UCITS ETF
 db x-trackers MSCI Brazil Index UCITS ETF (DR)
 db x-trackers MSCI EM Asia Index UCITS ETF
 db x-trackers MSCI Emerging Markets Index UCITS ETF
 db x-trackers MSCI Europe Index UCITS ETF (DR) 
 db x-trackers MSCI India Index UCITS ETF
 db x-trackers MSCI Indonesia Index UCITS ETF
 db x-trackers MSCI Japan UCITS Index
 db x-trackers MSCI Korea UCITS Index ETF (DR)
 db x-trackers MSCI Malaysia Index UCITS ETF (DR)
 db x-trackers MSCI Philippines IM Index UCITS ETF
 db x-trackers MSCI Singapore IM Index UCITS ETF (DR)
 db x-trackers MSCI Taiwan Index UCITS ETF
 db x-trackers MSCI Russia Capped Index UCITS ETF
 db x-trackers MSCI USA Index UCITS ETF
 db x-trackers MSCI World Index UCITS ETF
 db x-trackers S&P/ASX 200 UCITS ETF (DR)
 db x-trackers S&P 500 Inverse Daily UCITS ETF
 db x-trackers S&P 500 UCITS ETF 
 db x-trackers US Dollar Cash UCITS ETF
 iShares Core S&P 500 ETF 
 iShares MSCI India ETF
 iShares MSCI Singapore ETF 
 iShares Barclays Capital USD Asia High Yield Bond Index ETF
 iShares J.P Morgan USD Asia Credit Bond Index
 Lyxor ETF China Enterprise (HSCEI)
 Lyxor ETF Commodities CRB
 Lyxor ETF Commodities Non-Energy
 Lyxor ETF Dow Jones Industrial Average
 Lyxor ETF FTSE EPRA/NAREIT Asia Ex-Japan
 Lyxor ETF Hong Kong (HSI)
 Lyxor ETF India (CNX Nifty)
 Lyxor ETF Japan (Topix)
 Lyxor ETF MSCI AC Asia-Pacific Ex Japan
 Lyxor ETF MSCI AC Asia Ex Japan
 Lyxor ETF MSCI Asia APEX 50
 Lyxor ETF MSCI India
 Lyxor ETF MSCI Korea
 Lyxor ETF MSCI Malaysia
 Lyxor ETF MSCI Taiwan
 Lyxor ETF MSCI Thailand
 Lyxor ETF Nasdaq-100
 Lyxor ETF MSCI Emerging Markets
 Lyxor ETF MSCI Europe
 Lyxor ETF MSCI Latin America
 Lyxor ETF Eastern Europe
 Lyxor ETF MSCI World
 Lyxor ETF Russia (DJ Rusindex Titans 10)
 Nikko AM Singapore STI ETF
 SPDR Dow Jones Industrial Average ETF
 SPDR S&P 500 ETF
 SPDR Straits Times Index Fund
 SPDR Gold Shares
 UNITED SSE 50 CHINA ETF

External links
SGX ETF

See also
List of exchange-traded funds

Singaporean